Alexandre Di Rocco, known as Alex Di Rocco (born December 30, 1970) is a retired French professional footballer.

References
 
 
 

1970 births
Living people
French footballers
French expatriate footballers
Expatriate footballers in Scotland
Scottish Premier League players
Amiens SC players
ES Troyes AC players
CS Sedan Ardennes players
AS Saint-Étienne players
Stade Malherbe Caen players
Aberdeen F.C. players
Ligue 1 players
Ligue 2 players
ASPV Strasbourg players
Association football forwards
People from Saint-Dié-des-Vosges
Sportspeople from Vosges (department)
Footballers from Grand Est